Sunlun Sayadaw, (born U Kyaw Din; 1878 - 1952) was a Burmese Sayadaw and vipassanā meditation master of Theravada Buddhism. He was named for Sunlun village, which is near Myingyan, middle Burma.

U Kyaw Din was a farmer who took up the practice of anapanasati (in-out breath) meditation on his own, with little instruction other than discussing it with two local friends. He practiced seriously and strenuously on his own and attained the first three stages of enlightenment 1920 before joining a monastery and becoming an arahat. Even though he was barely literate, he became a popular meditation teacher among the monks. There are currently several monasteries teaching Sunlun style practice in Burma such as the Sunlun Monastery of S. Okkalapa.

Sunlun Sayadaw taught an intense form of meditation which is done for a period of over 2 hours. The first 45 minutes includes strong, rapid and vigorous breathing, focusing on the sensation in the nose or upper lip. After this initial period, the meditators are to attend to mindfulness of sensations (vedana), especially any bodily pains, continuing without any movement for the rest of the 2 to 3 hour period.

See also
Buddhism
Theravada
Vipassanā

References

Further reading 
Kornfield, Jack. Living Dharma: Teachings and Meditation Instructions from Twelve Theravada Masters. Shambala Publications, 1996.

Burmese Buddhist monks
1878 births
1952 deaths